Pollanisus isolatus is a moth of the family Zygaenidae. It is only known from the type location Beaconsfield in Victoria, Australia.

The length of the forewings is about 7 mm for males.

External links
Australian Faunal Directory
Zygaenid moths of Australia: a revision of the Australian Zygaenidae

Moths of Australia
isolatus
Moths described in 2005